Idriss Miskine (15 March 1948 – 7 January 1984) was a Chadian politician and diplomat under Presidents Félix Malloum and Hissène Habré.

Career
Miskine, an ethnic Hadjarai, was the Minister of Transport, Posts, and Telecommunications under President Malloum until joining Habré's opposition Armed Forces of the North (FAN) movement in 1979. Upon FAN's capture of the capital N'Djamena in June 1982, Miskine became Foreign Minister. He died in January 1984 shortly before peace talks were set to begin in Addis Ababa.

Sources
 Profile on rulers.org

1948 births
1984 deaths
Chadian diplomats
Transport ministers of Chad
Foreign ministers of Chad